Lygodesmia aphylla is a species of flowering plant in the family Asteraceae known by the common name rose rush or rushweed. It has white, pink, or lavender flowers. It grows in Florida and Georgia and reaches between 1 and 3 feet tall.

References

External links

USDA Plants Profile

aphylla
Flora of Florida
Plants described in 1838